Julian Montgomery Francis (born 1960) has been Archdeacon of Walsall since 2019.

Francis was educated at Selwyn College, Cambridge, and ordained deacon in 1991; and priest in 1992. After a curacy in Wimbledon he was at West Bromwich, Coventry and Edgbaston.

References

1960 births
Alumni of Selwyn College, Cambridge
20th-century English Anglican priests
21st-century English Anglican priests
Living people
Archdeacons of Walsall